This is a list of traditional windmills in the American state of Massachusetts.

Check out the locations in linked "map all coordinates using OpenSourcMap":

Mills
Known building dates are in bold text. Non-bold text denotes first known date. Iron windpumps are outside the scope of this list unless listed on the National Register of Historic Places.

References

Sources
 

Massachusetts
Windmills